El Ángel Caído is the third studio album  by the Spanish Power metal band Avalanch and the last one featuring Víctor García, released in 2001. It features the collaboration of Leo Jiménez (from Saratoga and Stravaganzza).

Track listing 
All tracks written by Alberto Rionda
"Hacia la luz" ("To The Light")
"Tierra de nadie" ("No Man's Land")
"El ángel caído" ("The Fallen Angel")
"Xana"
"La buena nueva" ("The Good News")
"Levántate y anda" ("Get Up and Go")
"Alma en pena" ("Cursed Soul")
"Corazón negro" ("Black Heart")
"Delirios de grandeza" ("Delusions of Grandeur")
"Antojo de un Dios" ("Whim of A God")
"El séptimo día" ("The Seventh Day")
"Las ruinas del Edén (Acto I)" ("The Ruins of Eden (Act I)")
"Las ruinas del Edén (Acto II)" ("The Ruins of Eden (Act II)")
"Las ruinas del Edén (Acto III)" ("The Ruins of Eden (Act III)")
"Santa Bárbara" ("Saint Barbara")

Personnel
 Víctor García - vocals
 Francisco Fidalgo - bass
 Alberto Rionda - lead guitar
 Roberto García - rhythm guitar
 Alberto Ardines - drums
 Iván Blanco - keyboards

Collaborations 
 Leo Jiménez - vocals on "Las Ruinas del Edén, Acto II"
 Chorus by: Víctor García, Iván Blanco, Alberto Rionda, Ramón Lage, Marcos Cabal, Leo Jiménez, Tina Gutiérrez
 Omar Bouza - percussion
 Edel Pérez - percussion

References 

Avalanch albums
2001 albums